Rhoda is a television comedy that aired on CBS from 1974 to 1978. 

Rhoda can also refer to:

People:
 Rhoda (name), a female given name
 Rhoda (biblical figure), a person who appears briefly in the Acts of the Apostles
 Franklin Rhoda (1854–1929), American writer, surveyor and Presbyterian minister
 Hilary Rhoda (born 1987), American model

Places:
 Rhoda, Kentucky, an unincorporated community
 Rhoda, West Virginia, an unincorporated community
 Lake Rhoda, Colorado
 Rhoda Island, in the Nile River in Cairo, Egypt
 907 Rhoda, an asteroid

Other uses:
 Cyclone Rhoda (1971), a 1971 cyclone in the Indian Ocean
 Rhoda (horse) (1813–after 1836), a British Thoroughbred racehorse and broodmare